In algebraic geometry, the quotient space of an algebraic stack F, denoted by |F|, is a topological space which as a set is the set of all integral substacks of F and which then is given a "Zariski topology": an open subset has a form  for some open substack U of F.

The construction  is functorial; i.e., each morphism  of algebraic stacks determines a continuous map .

An algebraic stack X is punctual if  is a point.

When X is a moduli stack, the quotient space  is called the moduli space of X. If  is a morphism of algebraic stacks that induces a homeomorphism , then Y is called a coarse moduli stack of X. ("The" coarse moduli requires a universality.)

References 

H. Gillet, Intersection theory on algebraic stacks and Q-varieties, J. Pure Appl. Algebra 34 (1984), 193–240, Proceedings of the Luminy conference on algebraic K-theory (Luminy, 1983).

Algebraic geometry